Mukhtasar Tokhirova (born 5 March 2000) is a Uzbekistani sports shooter. She competed in the women's 10 metre air rifle event at the 2020 Summer Olympics.

References

External links
 

2000 births
Living people
Uzbekistani female sport shooters
Olympic shooters of Uzbekistan
Shooters at the 2020 Summer Olympics
Place of birth missing (living people)
21st-century Uzbekistani women